Ma Mingxin (1719–1781) was a Chinese Sufi master, the founder of the Jahriyya menhuan (Naqshbandi Sufi order).

Names
Ma Mingxin's Arabic given name was Ibrāhīm. After returning to China from Arabia he started calling himself 'Azīz.

He was also called Muhammad Emin. Followers of the Jahriyyah sometimes refer to him by the title of Wiqāyatullāh (Arabic: وقاية الله)

Life
A Chinese-speaking Muslim from Gansu,
Ma Mingxin spent 16 years studying in Mecca and Yemen. He was a disciple of a Naqshbandi Sufi teacher named 'Abd al-Khāliq, who was a son of az-Zayn b. Muhammad 'Abd al-Baqī al-Mizjaji  (1643/44-1725), originally of Mizjaja near Zabīd, Yemen. Az-Zayn, in his turn, had studied in Medina under the famous Kurdish mystic Ibrahīm ibn Hasan al-Kūrānī (1616–1690), who was known for advocating the vocal (rather than silent) dhikr (invocation of the name of God).

After returning to China in 1761, Ma Mingxin founded the Jahriyya menhuan (order) - the second Naqshbandi order in China after Ma Laichi's Khufiyya. In opposition to the "silent" Khufiyya Sufis, and following al-Kurani's teaching, Jahriyya adherents advocated vocal dhikr, which is reflected in the name of their school (from Arabic jahr, "aloud"). Ma Mingxin also opposed the emphasis that the Khufiyya members placed of the veneration of the saints, construction of grandiose elaborately decorated mosques, and the enrichment of religious leaders at the expense of their adherents.

By the early 1780s, Ma Mingxin's Jahriyya had spread over much of the then province of Gansu (which at the time also included today's Qinghai and Ningxia), as had the late Ma Laichi's Khufiyya menhuan.  Theological arguments between members of the two menhuans, as well as the orders' claim on members' contributions, against the background of government mismanagement of the provincial revenue, often resulted in both violent conflicts and lawsuits.

The escalating conflict between the adherents of the two movements eventually attracted attention of the Qing government in 1781. The apparent center of the conflict at the time was in the ethnic Salar community of Xunhua County (in today's Qinghai Province, just west of today's Gansu's Linxia Prefecture). Considering the Jahriyya (dubbed by the government The New Teaching, in opposition to the "Old Teaching", i.e. the Khfiyya and the non-Sufi (gedimu) Muslims) subversive, the authorities had Ma Mingxin arrested, even though he wasn't personally anywhere around Xunhua at the moment.

While Ma Mingxin was kept in Lanzhou during the Jahriyya revolt, a government expedition sent to Xunhua to take care of the Jahriyya business was destroyed by the Jahriyya Salars, who then rushed across the today's Linxia Prefecture and to the walls of Lanzhou. When the besieged officials brought Ma Mingxin, wearing chains, to the city wall, to show him to the rebels, the Salars at once showed respect and devotion to their imprisoned leaders. Scared officials took Ma down from the wall, and beheaded him right away.

Ma Mingxin's widow, whose surname was Zhang (originally, from Gansu's Tongwei County), and his daughters were exiled to Xinjiang.

Legacy
Ma Mingxin's death did not stop conflicts with China's Muslim community, or those between the Muslims and the government. Three years after the death of Ma Mingxin, his follower Tian Wu started a rebellion against the imperial government; after its defeat, the authorities remained on lookout against the spread of the "subversive" Jahriyya teachings.

Ma Mingxin's fifth generation descendant and the then leader of Jahriyya, Ma Hualong, was one of the chief leaders of the Great Northwest Hui Rebellion in Ningxia, Shaanxi, and Gansu in the 1860s.

The Jahriyya order continues to this day, even if in more covert forms. In remembrance of Ma Mingxin, whose beard was shorn by government  soldiers before his execution, many Jahriyya members shave the sides of their beards.

In 1985, over 20,000 Chinese Muslims  assembled at the site of Ma Mingxin's original (destroyed) tomb near Lanzhou for a commemoration ceremony. The tomb has since been rebuilt.

Ma Mingxin's descendant was Ma Yuanzhang.

Ma Shaowu was a fourth generation descendant of Ma Mingxin, and Ma Shaowu's uncle Ma Yuanzhang was also a descendant, as was Ma Shaowu's great uncle Ma Shenglin . Ma Shaowu's son Ma Cho-ya is a fifth generation descendant and he currently lives in Urumqi.

References

18th-century Chinese people
Hui people
Naqshbandi order
Chinese Sufis
1719 births
1781 deaths